Brian Acton (born 1972/1973) is an American computer programmer and Internet entrepreneur. Acton is the executive chairman of the Signal Technology Foundation, which he co-founded with Moxie Marlinspike in 2018. , Acton also serves as interim CEO of Signal Messenger LLC.

He was formerly employed at Yahoo!, and co-founded WhatsApp, a mobile messaging application which was acquired by Facebook in February 2014 for US$19 billion, with Jan Koum. Acton left WhatsApp in September 2017 to start the Signal Foundation. According to Forbes (2020), Acton is the 836th-richest person in the world, with a net worth of $2.5 billion.

Early life and education
Acton grew up in Michigan, later moving to Central Florida, where he graduated from Lake Howell High School. Acton received a full scholarship to study engineering at the University of Pennsylvania, but left after a year to study at Stanford. He graduated from Stanford University in 1994 with a degree in computer science.

Career
In 1992, he became a systems administrator for Rockwell International, before becoming a product tester at Apple Inc. and Adobe Systems. In 1996, he joined Yahoo Inc.

Yahoo!
In 1998, Jan Koum was hired by Yahoo! as an infrastructure engineer shortly after he met Acton while working at Ernst & Young as a security tester. Over the next nine years, they worked at Yahoo!. Acton invested in the dotcom boom and lost millions in the dot-com bubble of 2000. In September 2007 Koum and Acton left Yahoo! and took a year off, traveling around South America and playing ultimate frisbee. Both applied unsuccessfully to work at Facebook. In January 2009, Koum bought an iPhone and realized that the then seven-month-old App Store was about to spawn a whole new industry of apps. He visited his friend Alex Fishman and talked about developing an app. Koum almost immediately chose the name WhatsApp because it sounded like "what's up", and a week later on his birthday, Feb. 24, 2009, he incorporated WhatsApp Inc. in California.

WhatsApp
In 2014, Koum and Acton sold WhatsApp to Facebook for approximately US$19 billion in cash and stock. Forbes estimated that Acton held over 20% stake in the company, making his net worth around $3.8 billion.

In 2016, Acton led a funding round for Trak N Tell and raised $3.5 million along with two other investors.

In September 2017, Acton left WhatsApp. Acton told Forbes that he left over a dispute with Facebook regarding monetization of WhatsApp, and voluntarily left $850 million in unvested options on the table by leaving a few months before vesting was completed. He also said that he was coached by Facebook executives to mislead European regulators regarding Facebook's intention to merge Facebook and WhatsApp user data.

Signal 
Acton left WhatsApp in September 2017 to start a new foundation, the Signal Foundation, which is dedicated to helping people have access to private communication through an encrypted messaging app. Signal is broadly used by journalists and human rights activists.

In February 2018, it was announced that Acton was investing $50 million into Signal.  This funding was a loan from Brian Acton to the new non-profit Signal Technology Foundation.  By the end of 2018, the loan had increased to $105,000,400, which is due to be repaid on February 28, 2068.  The loan is unsecured and at 0% interest.

On March 20, 2018, Forbes reported that Acton had publicly tweeted support for the #DeleteFacebook movement, in a "new level of public backlash". In November 2019, the journalist Steven Levy asked Acton why he decided to make his feelings so public. Acton said he felt that it was time because there was pressure unfolding against Facebook.

Acton is currently a board member of the Signal Foundation.

Philanthropy
Since 2014, Brian Acton and his wife Tegan Acton started to build a philanthropic network through the foundation Wildcard Giving, with three sister foundations: Sunlight Giving, Acton Family Giving and Solidarity Giving.

The couple started Sunlight Giving in 2014, a family foundation dedicated to supporting the basic services of low-income families with young children ages 0–5. It also provides support for safe spaces and organizations that ensure food security, housing stability, and healthcare access. The foundation supports low-income families with children age five and below living in the San Francisco Bay Area. It's a sister organization belonging to the Wildcard Giving family. Sunlight Giving has $470 million in assets. It granted $6.4 million in 2015, $19.2 million in 2016, and $23.6 million in 2017. This private foundation helped to fund Magnify Community, a non-profit organization with the goal of redirecting philanthropists' givings to nonprofits.

Also in 2014, Acton helped establish Acton Family Giving and Solidarity Giving.

In 2019, Forbes reported that Brian Acton and his wife had given more than $1 billion to charitable causes over their lifetimes.

Personal life
He is married to Tegan Acton and resides in Palo Alto, CA.

References

External links
 
 Brian Acton on Forbes

Living people
American billionaires
American computer businesspeople
American computer programmers
American software engineers
American technology company founders
Apple Inc. people
Businesspeople from Michigan
People from Michigan
Stanford University School of Engineering alumni
University of Central Florida alumni
University of Pennsylvania School of Engineering and Applied Science alumni
Yahoo! employees
Giving Pledgers
21st-century American philanthropists
1970s births